Rigor Mortis Sets In is the third solo studio album by English rock musician John Entwistle, who was the bassist for the Who at that time. Distributed by Track Records, the album was named John Entwistle's Rigor Mortis Sets In in the US. Co-produced by Entwistle and John Alcock, it consists of two 1950s rock and roll covers, one 1960s cover, a new version of the Entwistle song "My Wife" from the Who's fifth studio album Who's Next (1971), and new tracks (only six of the ten songs were new). Rigor Mortis Sets In set in motion Entwistle assembling his own touring unit during the increasing periods of the Who's inactivity.

Bearing the dedication "In Loving Memory of Rock 'n' Roll 1950–∞: Never Really Passed Away Just Ran Out of Time", Entwistle's affection for 1950s rock and roll was evident by cover versions of Elvis Presley's "Hound Dog", and Little Richard's "Lucille". As George Lucas had released American Graffiti (1973) at the same time as Rigor Mortis Sets In was released, creating a huge market for 1950s nostalgia, Entwistle's timing was uncannily prescient. In Entwistle's original material for the album, light whimsy prevailed over the darker (and more creative) vein of Smash Your Head Against the Wall (1971) and Whistle Rymes (1972). The album was completed in less than three weeks, ultimately costing $10,000 in studio time and $4,000 on liquor bills.

The cover art of the gatefold LP features on one cover an outdoor photo of a grave, whose heart-shaped headstone is engraved with the dedication described above, while the grave's footstone is inscribed "V.S.O.P." (a grading acronym for cognac). The opposite cover features a wooden coffin bearing a brass plate engraved with the album's name. The UK (Track) LP used the coffin on the cover and the gravestone on the inner gatefold, while the US (MCA) LP had the opposite arrangement. CD releases have been fronted with Track's original coffin cover, with the gravestone cover proportionally preserved inside as part of the liner notes.

Rigor Mortis Sets In had a rough launch due to its title and cover art. BBC Radio refused to play the album and banned it, ironically in part due to the influence of disc jockey (DJ) Jimmy Savile who had just suffered a death in his family. The album's US debut was problematic for MCA Records (Track's new American distributor), who insisted on appending the artist's name to the title, out of concern that the album's sales would be weak without the Entwistle name in the title.

Critical reception

The album was considered by AllMusic to be a "nosedive" in his career compared to Smash Your Head Against the Wall and Whistle Rymes. His covers of "Hound Dog" and "Lucille" were so "lifelessly performed that it sounds like the band is merely attempting to imitate Sha Na Na instead of sending up the original tunes themselves". The song that was known as the biggest offender in this respect was "Mr. Bass Man" which replaces the enthusiasm of Johnny Cymbal's original version with a self-consciously campy production built on cutesy vocals guaranteed to make listeners grind their teeth.

The album was more positively received by John Rockwell of The New York Times. In a 1973 article about solo albums released by members of popular bands, Rockwell said that the album found Entwistle "working effectively in a straight-ahead fifties idiom that the Who themselves have long since abandoned."

Track listing

Personnel
Musicians
 John Entwistle – lead vocals, bass guitar, electric guitar, keyboards
 Alan Ross – electric guitar, acoustic guitar, piano, accordion, trumpet, synthesizer; lead vocals (2)
 Jim Ryan – lead guitar
 Graham Deakin – drums, percussion (5, 6, 8)
 Tony Ashton – keyboards, Hammond organ, piano
 Bryan Williams – trombone, electric organ (6, 8)
 Howie Casey – saxophone (1, 3, 4)
 Members of the Ladybirds:
 Gloria George – backing vocals
 Maggie Stredder – backing vocals
 Marian Davies – backing vocals

Technical
 Mike Weighell – engineer

References

External links
 

1973 albums
John Entwistle albums
Track Records albums